Ard Ayush (full name: Алдаржавын Аюуш (tr. Aldarjaviin Ayush ; 1858—1939) was the leader of an Arat rebellion in southwestern Khovd Province from 1903 until 1917.

Biography 
Ard Ayush was born in 1858 in Darhan Beile banner, Zasagt Khan aimag (now Tsetseg sum, Khovd aimag) as a tributary of banner khan Manibazar. In 1903 he led the protest of Arat herdsmen and Tayijis against the injustices of the khan in regard to his tributaries. In 1911–1917 he continued resistance against the unjust khan's actions and Chinese colonial oppression. Later Ard Ayush took an active part in the People's Revolution of 1921 and became a member of the government in the Mongolian People's Republic.

In popular culture 
The heroism of Ard Ayush repeatedly inspired artists in Mongolia, examples include:
 «Ard Ayush» movie by B. Sonom
 «Ard Ayush» opera by B. Baasanjav

References 
 Нацокдоржи Ш. Из истории аратского движения во Внешней Монголии. — М., 1958.
 Чойжилсүрэн Л. Ард Аюуш. — Улаанбаатар, 2002.

1858 births
1939 deaths
Mongolian revolutionaries